Puli Thevan was a Tamil 
 Palaiyakkarar who ruled Nerkattumseval, situated in the Sankarankoil taluk, Tenkasi, formerly Tirunelveli Tamil Nadu. He is notable for fighting against East India Company from May 22, 1752 - 1767 in India. Ondiveeran and Venni Kaladi were the generals of Thevar's army, to fight against the East India Company. He is known for the Polygars revolt against the British. He maintained a good relationship with the Kingdom of Travancore but later the allegiance was broken by one Yusuf Khan.

See also
Alagumuthukone
Maruthu Pandiyar
Rani Velu Nachiar
Periya Kaladi
Ondiveeran

References

Indian revolutionaries
Indian independence activists from Tamil Nadu